Kharkhari Lake also known as Kharkhari Danda in Pashto is an alpine glacial lake located in the Gabral Valley to the north of Kalam Valley in Swat District of Khyber Pakhtunkhwa, Pakistan. It is reachable by road from the town of Kalam, following the Utror river to Bahandra. From Bahandra, one must hike to Kharkhari Lake which takes up to 2 hours.

Kharkhari lake is sometimes called Gabral Lake, as it is situated near the Utror Gabral valley.
After flooding in 2010, roads are affected badly so most people use a 4x4 vehicle to reach the lake.

One has to pass from the towns of Utror and Gabral to reach the lake, known for the scenic beauty of their surrounding valleys. Travel time is approximately 3 hours. One can find trees of walnut, apple, and pears throughout the way.
A final one kilometre walk takes one to the brink of the lake. Unlike Utror River, Kharkhari is calm. The hypnotic quietude is only interrupted every now and then by tourists who camp along its banks. The lake is predominantly blue with a hint of green which is highlighted by the sunlight filtering through the water surface.

3 days hike from here onward from the lake will lead to Chitral.

See also
Katora Lake - Kumrat Valley
Saidgai Lake - Swat Valley
Mahodand Lake - Kalam Valley
Kundol Lake - Kalam Valley
Daral Lake - Swat Valley
Lake Saiful Muluk - Kaghan Valley
List of Tourist attractions in Swat - List of tourist attractions in Swat

References

External links

 Summer retreat: The jewel in Swat’s crown - Dawn News
 KharKhari Lake Kalam, Peshawar
 Kharkhari Lake Swat - KamiSyed
 Elevation of Lake Kharkhari, Swat, Khyber Pakhtunkhwa, Pakistan
 Kharkhari Lake Gabral Swat - -NA-

Tourist attractions in Swat
Lakes of Khyber Pakhtunkhwa
Swat District